Hinduism is the second largest religious affiliation in Pakistan after Islam. While Hinduism was one of the dominant faiths in the region a few centuries back, today Hindus account for 2.14% of Pakistan's population or 4.4 million people according to the 2017 Pakistan Census, although Pakistan Hindu Council has claimed that there are 8 million Hindus living in Pakistan, making up 4% of the country's population. The Umerkot district has the highest percentage of Hindu residents in the country at 52.2%, while Tharparkar district has the most Hindus in absolute numbers at 714,698. 

Before the partition, according to the 1941 census, Hindus constituted 14.6% of the population in West Pakistan (which is now Pakistan) and 28% of the population in East Pakistan (now Bangladesh). After Pakistan gained independence from the British Raj, 4.7 million of West Pakistan's Hindus and Sikhs moved to India as refugees. And in the first census afterwards in 1951, Hindus made up 1.6% of the total population of West Pakistan (now Pakistan), and 22% of East Pakistan (now Bangladesh).

Hindus in Pakistan are primarily concentrated in Sindh, where the majority of Hindu enclaves are found in Pakistan. They speak a variety of languages such as Sindhi, Seraiki, Aer, Dhatki, Gera, Goaria, Gurgula, Jandavra, Kabutra, Koli, Loarki, Marwari, Sansi, Vaghri, and Gujarati. Many Hindus, especially in the rural areas, follow the teachings of local Sufi pīrs (Urdu: spiritual guide) or adhere to the 14th-century saint Ramdevji, whose main temple Shri Ramdev Pir temple is located in Tando Allahyar. A growing number of urban Hindu youth in Pakistan associate themselves with ISKCON society. Other communities worship manifold "Mother Goddesses" as their clan or family patrons. A different branch, the Nanakpanth, follows the teachings of the Guru Granth Sahib, also known as the holy book of the Sikhs. This diversity, especially in rural Sindh, often thwarts classical definitions between Hinduism, Sikhism and Islam.

Though the Constitution of Pakistan provides equal rights to all citizens and is not supposed to discriminate between anyone on the basis of caste, creed or religion, Islam remains the State religion giving more privileges to Muslims than to Hindus and other religious minorities. There have been numerous cases of violence and discrimination against Hindus, along with other minorities. There have also been cases of violence and ill-treatment of Hindus, due to strict Blasphemy laws.

One of the most important places of worship for Hindus in Pakistan is the shrine of Shri Hinglaj Mata temple in Balochistan. The annual Hinglaj Yatra is the largest Hindu pilgrimage in Pakistan. Out of 365 Hindu temples in Pakistan, 13 are being managed by the Evacuee Trust Property Board, leaving the responsibility of 65 to the Hindu community.

History

Prior to the 1947 Partition of India

Origins

Pakistan was the fulcrum of Indus Valley Civilization, one of the oldest civilizations in the world. It is assumed that the Pashupati image of Mohenjo-daro evolved to be worshipped as Shiva and the Mother Goddess as Shakti. Various archaeological finds such as the Swastika symbol and Yogic postures from Indus Valley Civilization also point to early influences that may have shaped Hinduism. The religious beliefs and folklore of the Indus valley people have become a major part of the Hindu faith that evolved in this part of the South Asia.

Later, during the Vedic period, the Rig Veda, the oldest Hindu text, is believed to have been composed in the Punjab region of modern-day Pakistan (and India) on the banks of the Indus River around 1500 BCE.

The Sindh kingdom and its rulers play an important role in the Indian epic story of the Mahabharata. In addition, a Hindu legend states that the Pakistani city of Lahore was first founded by Lava, while Kasur was founded by his twin Kusha, both of whom were the sons of Lord Rama of the Ramayana. The Gandhara kingdom of the northwest, and the legendary Gandhara people, are also a major part of Hindu literature such as the Ramayana and the Mahabharata. Many Pakistani city names (such as Peshawar and Multan) have Sanskrit roots.

Pre-Islamic period 
The Vedic period (1500–500 BCE) was characterised by an Indo-Aryan culture; during this period the Vedas, the oldest scriptures associated with Hinduism, were composed, and this culture later became well established in the region. Multan was an important Hindu pilgrimage centre. The Vedic civilisation flourished in the ancient Gandhāran city of Takṣaśilā, now Taxila in the Punjab, which was founded around 1000 BCE. Successive ancient empires and kingdoms ruled the region: the Persian Achaemenid Empire (around 519 BCE), Alexander's empire in 326 BCE and the Maurya Empire, founded by Chandragupta Maurya and extended by Ashoka the Great, until 185 BCE. The Indo-Greek Kingdom founded by Demetrius of Bactria (180–165 BCE) included Gandhara and Punjab and reached its greatest extent under Menander (165–150 BCE), prospering the Greco-Buddhist culture in the region. Taxila had one of the earliest universities and centres of higher education in the world, which was established during the late Vedic period in 6th century BCE. The school consisted of several monasteries without large dormitories or lecture halls where the religious instruction was provided on an individualistic basis. The ancient university was documented by the invading forces of Alexander the Great and was also recorded by Chinese pilgrims in the 4th or 5th century CE.

At its zenith, the Rai Dynasty (489–632 CE) of Sindh ruled this region and the surrounding territories. The Pala Dynasty was the last Buddhist empire, which, under Dharmapala and Devapala, stretched across South Asia from what is now Bangladesh through Northern India to Pakistan.

Early Muslim conquests and invasion of Sindh 
After the conquest of Sindh by Muhammad bin Qasim and the loss of Raja Dahir, Islamization in Pakistan started and the population of Hindus started declining. After that many other Islamic conquests in Indian subcontinent entered through the Pakistan's region, including that of Ghaznavids, Ghurids and Delhi Sultanate, due to which the Buddhists and Hindus were converted to Islam. In the era of Mughal Empire, the land of Pakistan became a Muslim-majority area.

Post-independence period (1947–present) 

At the time of Pakistan's creation the 'two nation theory' had been espoused. According to this theory the Hindu minority in Pakistan was to be given a fair deal in Pakistan in order to ensure the protection of the Muslim minority in India. Muhammad Ali Jinnah, the founder of Pakistan, stated in an address to the constituent assembly of Pakistan, "You will find that in course of time Hindus will cease to be Hindus and Muslims will cease to be Muslims, not in the religious sense, because that is the personal faith of each individual, but in the political sense as the citizens of the State." However, Khawaja Nazimuddin, the 2nd Prime Minister of Pakistan stated: 

After the independence of Pakistan in 1947, over 4.7 million Hindus and Sikhs from West Pakistan left for India, and 6.5 million Muslims chose to migrate to Pakistan. The reasons for this exodus were the heavily charged communal atmosphere in British Raj, deep distrust of each other, the brutality of violent mobs and the antagonism between the religious communities. That over 1 million people lost their lives in the bloody violence of 1947 should attest to the fear and hate that filled the hearts of millions of Hindus, Muslims and Sikhs who left ancestral homes hastily after independence.

Demographics

 Hinduism (%) in Pakistan by decades

The 1961 Census of Pakistan (Volume 1 – page 24 of Part II – Statement 2.19) released historical estimates to the nearest thousandth on the religious composition of the country for 60 years prior by amalgamating figures from administrative divisions that would ultimately compose regions situated in West Pakistan (contemporary Pakistan) taken from past decadal censuses in British India. These historical census estimates detailed that Hindus numbered approximately 2,327,000 persons and comprised roughly 17.1 percent of the total population in 1901, followed by a decline to around 2,267,000 persons or to 14.1 percent in 1911. The Hindu population would rise to approximately 2,523,000 persons in 1921, with the share of the total population rising slightly to 14.8 percent, prior to declining slightly to 14.6 percent in 1931, despite the total Hindu population growing to roughly 3,115,000 persons. Ergo in the absence of partition in 1947 and other anti-social events that followed, it is estimated the present-day Pakistan hindu population would be approximately 30,320,000 or 14.6%, well above the current population of 4.44 million or 2.14%, as reported in the 2017 Census of Pakistan.

In the final census taken prior to partition in 1941, Hindus constituted 14.6% of the population in West Pakistan (currently Pakistan) and 28% of the population in East Pakistan (currently Bangladesh). After Pakistan gained independence from Britain on 14August 1947, 4.7 million of the country's Hindus and Sikhs migrated to India. In the 1951 census, West Pakistan (now Pakistan) had 1.3% Hindu population, while East Pakistan (now Bangladesh) had 22.05%. During the same census, Hindus constituted approximately 12.9% of the total population of Pakistan (composing contemporary Pakistan and Bangladesh) which represented the second-largest Hindu-population country after India. After 1971, Bangladesh separated from Pakistan and the population of Hindus and other Non-Muslims declined in Pakistan as Bangladesh population was no longer part of the census conducted in Pakistan. The 1998 census of Pakistan recorded 2,443,614 Hindus, which (includes 332,343 scheduled caste Hindus), which constitutes to 1.85 percentage of the total population of Pakistan. and about 7.5% in the Sindh province. The 2017 census recorded 4,444,870 Hindus (includes 849,614 scheduled caste Hindus) which constituting 2.14% of the total population of Pakistan. However, the Pakistan Hindu Council claims the Hindu population to be around 8 million as of 2020.

In 1956, the government of Pakistan declared 32 castes and tribes, the majority of them Hindus, to be scheduled castes, including Kohlis, Meghawars, and Bheels. The Pakistan Census separates the members of scheduled castes from Hindus and has assessed that they form 0.41% of the national population in 2017 census (up from 0.25% in 1998 census).
However, the actual population of Scheduled Caste Hindus is expected to be much higher, as the Scheduled Caste Hindus categorise themselves as Hindus in the census rather than as Scheduled Castes.

As per the data from the Election Commission of Pakistan, as of 2018 there were a total of 1.77 million Hindu voters. Hindu voters were 49% of the total in Umerkot and 46% in Tharparkar. According to estimates in religious minorities in Pakistan's elections, the Hindus have a population of 50,000 or more in 11 districts. All of these are in Sindh except the Rahim Yar Khan District in Punjab.

1941 census

Population by province 

According to the 1941 census, the Hindu population in Pakistan comprised roughly 3.93 million persons or 14.6 percent of the total population. With the exception of the Federally Administered Tribal Areas, all administrative divisions in the region that compose contemporary Pakistan collected religious data, with a combined population of 26,970,214, for an overall response rate of 91.9 percent out of the total population of 29,347,813, as detailed in the table below.

2017 census

Population by province 
The percent of population of Hindus (separating the scheduled castes from other Hindus) in the provinces in Pakistan, according to the 2017 census:

Population by district 

Umerkot district (52.15%) is the only Hindu majority district in Pakistan. Tharparkar district has the highest population of Hindus in terms of absolute terms. The four districts- Umerkot, Tharparkar, Mirpurkhas and Sanghar hosts more than half of the Hindu population in Pakistan.

All districts with a Hindu population greater than 1%, according to the 2017 census. In other districts the population of Hindus is less than 1%.

Population controversy 
The official number of Hindus living in Pakistan is about 4.5 million or approx. 2.15% as per 2017 census conducted by Pakistan government authority. However, at different time some of the demographic experts of Pakistan Hindu council as well as various Hindu politicians have given numbers based on their estimation research which have led to various controversies. Pakistan has been accused on undercounting minority population over the decades. Karachi Supreme Court attorney Neel Keshav claimed that the Hindu population in Pakistan is likely to be much higher, as reported by Pakistan Today newspaper. Neel Keshav further claimed that the 1998 census data showed a Hindu population of nearly 2 million. While the new census showed that it had only risen to 3.5 million in 20 years," which throws a light possibility of undercounting Hindu population.

Religious conversions

Forced Conversion of Minority Hindu girls to Islam 

One of the biggest issues the Hindu community faces in Pakistan is the forced conversion of minor Hindu girls to Islam; the number of such conversions, according to one highest estimate, is up to 1,000 per year.

The girls are usually kidnapped by complicit acquaintances and relatives or men looking for brides. Sometimes they are taken by powerful landlords as payment for outstanding debts by their farmhand parents, and the authorities often look the other way. In one case, a landlord abducted a Hindu daughter from a farm worker and falsely claimed the teen was compensation for a $1,000 debt that the family owed him. Religious institutions and persons like Abdul Haq (Mitthu Mian) politician and caretaker of Bharachundi Sharif Dargah in Ghotki district and Pir Ayub Jan Sirhindi, the caretaker of Dargah pir sarhandi in Umerkot District support forced conversions and are known to have support and protection of ruling political parties of Sindh. According to the National Commission of Justice and Peace and the Pakistan Hindu Council (PHC) around 1000 non-Muslim minority women are converted to Islam and then forcibly married off. This practice is being reported increasingly in the districts of Tharparkar, Umerkot and Mirpur Khas in Sindh.

In November 2016, a bill against forced conversion was passed unanimously by the Sindh Provisional Assembly. However, the bill failed to make it into law as the Governor returned the bill. The Bill was effectively blocked by political parties like the Council of Islamic Ideology and Jamaat-e-Islami.

In 2019, a bill against forced conversion was proposed by Hindu politicians in the Sindh assembly, but was turned down by the ruling Pakistan Peoples Party lawmakers.

Conversions to Christianity
There are also Irish Christian missionaries and Ahmadiyya missionaries operating in the Thar region. The Christian and Ahmadi missionaries offer impoverished Hindus schools, health clinics etc. as an inducement for those who convert. Korean Christian missionaries are also very active in Sindh, who have built schools from Badin to Tharparkar.

Korean Christian missionaries have converted more than 1,000 Hindu families in 2012 alone. According to the Sono Kangharani, a member of the Pakistan Dalit Network, the Korean missionaries have been active in the area since 2011 and these missionaries don't focus on individuals but they convert entire villages. According to him, about 200 to 250 Hindu villages were converted in the last two and a half years between 2014 and 2016.

Incentivized Conversion to Islam

Many Hindus are induced to convert to Islam for easily getting Watan Cards and National Identification Cards. These converts were also given land and money. For example, 428 poor Hindus in Matli were converted between 2009 and 2011 by the Madrassa Baitul Islam, a Deobandi seminary in Matli, which pays off the debts of Hindus converting to Islam. Another example is the conversion of 250 Hindus to Islam in Chohar Jamali area in Thatta. Conversions are also carried out by Baba Deen Mohammad Shaikh mission which converted 108,000 people to Islam since 1989.

Social, religious and political institutions

 
The Pakistan Hindu Panchayat, Pakistan Hindu Council, Pakistan Hindu Youth Council and the Pakistani Hindu Welfare Association are the primary civic organizations that represent and organise Hindu communities on social, economic, religious and political issues in most of the country, with the exception of the Shiv Temple Society of Hazara, which especially represents community interests in the Hazara region of Khyber Pakhtunkhwa, in addition to being the special guardians of the Shiva temple, at Chitti Gatti village, near Mansehra. The Pakistan Hindu Council runs 13 schools across Tharparkar and also conducts mass wedding of poor Hindu couples. The Dalit Sujag Tehreek is a Scheduled Caste Hindu movement representing the scheduled caste Hindu communities like Kolhi, Bheel, Meghwar, Oad, Bhagri etc.

ISKCON also has a presence in Pakistan. It is involved in preaching and distributing Urdu translated Bhagavad Gita. It has a large following among the Scheduled Caste Hindus in Urban areas of Pakistan. There is a significant increase in the influence of Iskcon due to its rejection of caste system. Iskcon has been conducting Rathayatras since 2015.

There was a Ministry of Minority Affairs in the Government of Pakistan which looked after specific issues concerning Pakistani religious minorities. In 2011, the Government of Pakistan closed the Ministry of Minority Affairs. And a new ministry Ministry for National Harmony was formed for the protection of the rights of the minorities in Pakistan. But in 2013, the Ministry of National Harmony was merged with the Ministry of Religious Affairs despite opposition from the minorities.

In Pakistani law and politics
The Constitution's Article 51(2A) provides 10 reserved seats for non-Muslims in the National Assembly, 23 reserved seats for non-Muslims in the four provincial assemblies under Article 106 and four seats for non-Muslims in the Senate of Pakistan. Conventionally, Hindus were allotted 4 or 5 seats.
The number of national Assembly seats were increased from 207 in 1997, to 332 in 2002. But the number of non-Muslim reserved seats were not increased from 10. Similarly, the number of seats in Provincial Assembly of Sindh and Punjab were increased from 100 to 159 and 240 to 363 respectively, but the non-Muslim reserved seats were not increased. Although a bill for increasing minorities' seats was introduced by Ramesh Kumar Vankwani, it was not passed. Political parties Jamiat Ulema-e-Islam (F) party is against giving reserved seats for minorities.

In 1980s Zia ul-Haq introduced a system under which non-Muslims could vote for only candidates of their own religion. Seats were reserved for minorities in the national and provincial assemblies. Government officials stated that the separate electorates system is a form of affirmative action designed to ensure minority representation, and that efforts are underway to achieve a consensus among religious minorities on this issue, but critics argued that under this system Muslim candidates no longer had any incentive to pay attention to the minorities. Hindu community leader Sudham Chand protested against the system but was murdered. In 1999, Pakistan abolished this system.
Hindus and other minorities achieved a rare political victory in 2002 with the removal of separate electorates for Muslims and non-Muslims. The separate electorate system had marginalized non-Muslims by depriving them of adequate representation in the assemblies. The Pakistan Hindu Welfare Association was active by convening a national conference on the issue in December 2000. And in 2001, Hindus, Christians, and Ahmadis successfully conducted a partial boycott of the elections, culminating in the abolishment of the separate electorate system in 2002. This allowed religious minorities to vote for mainstream seats in the National and Provincial assemblies, rather than being confined to voting for only minority seats. Despite the victory, however, Hindus still remain largely disenfranchised.

In 2006, Ratna Bhagwandas Chawla became the first Hindu woman elected to the Senate of Pakistan. Although there is reservation of seats for women in Pakistan National Assembly, not a single seat was allotted for non-Muslim women till 2018. In 2018, Krishna Kumari Kohli, a Hindu woman became the first non-Muslim woman to win a women's reserved seat in Senate of Pakistan.

In 2018, Pakistan general election Mahesh Kumar Malani became the first Hindu candidate who won a general seat in Pakistan National Assembly 2018. He won the seat from Tharparkar-II and thus became the first non-Muslim to win a general seat (non-reserved) in Pakistan national assembly. In the Sindh provincial assembly election which took place along with the Pakistan National Assembly election 2018, Hari Ram Kishori Lal and Giyan Chand Essrani were elected from the Sindh provincial assembly seats. They became the first non-Muslims to win a general seat (non-reserved) in a provincial assembly election.

Hindu communities

Sindhi Hindus

Tamil Hindus

Some Tamil Hindu families migrated to Pakistan in the early 20th century, when Karachi was developed during the British Raj, and were later joined by Sri Lankan Tamils who arrived during the Sri Lankan Civil War. The Madrasi Para area is home to around 100 Tamil Hindu families. The Maripata Mariamman Temple, which has been demolished, was the biggest Tamil Hindu temple in Karachi. The Drigh Road and Korangi also have a small Tamil Hindu population.

Kalasha people

The Kalasha people practice a religion which is based on an older set of mountain beliefs, but which has some vedic influence, alongside animism and shamanism. Though having some cultural and religious similarities to the Hindus, they are considered a separate ethnic religion people by the government of Pakistan. They reside in the Chitral District of Khyber-Pakhtunkhwa province.

Nanakpanthis

Nanakpanthi are Hindus who revere Guru Nanak, the founder of Sikhism along with Hindu gods. Today, a large fraction of Sindhi Hindus consider themselves Nanakpanthi.

Balmiki Hindus

The Valmiki or Balmikis are Hindu worshippers of Valmiki, the author of The Ramayana. Most Valmiki Hindus converted to either Christianity or Islam after the partition. However, many of those who converted still worship Valmiki and celebrate Valmiki Jayanti. The most important centre for worship of Valmikis in Pakistan is Valmiki Mandir in Lahore. Most of the Balmikis (or Valmikis) belonged to the Schedule Caste.

Pashtun Hindus 

In the early times, before the Islamic conquest of Afghanistan, most of the modern-day Pashtun people belonged to the Hindu Religion. Though due to the repeated Islamic invasion in the Pakhtun areas, most of them have converted to Islam or migrated to other parts of the Asia. Still, there is a small Pashtun Hindu community, known as the Sheen Khalai meaning 'blue skinned' (referring to the color of Pashtun women's facial tattoos), migrated to Unniara, Rajasthan, India after partition. Prior to 1947, the community resided in the Quetta, Loralai and Maikhter regions of the British Indian province of Baluchistan. They are mainly members of the Pashtun Kakar tribe. Today, they continue to speak Pashto and celebrate Pashtun culture through the Attan dance.

Punjabi Hindus

There is a small population of Punjabi Hindus living in the Punjab province of Pakistan, most notably in Lahore where there are some 200 Hindu families. Though most of the Punjabis were Hindu in the 1900s and many migrated to India after the partition of the India and Pakistan in 1947. In the modern times most of the Punjabi Hindus are settled in United States, Germany, England, Canada and Australia due to their mass migration (or diaspora). A small proportion of Afghan Punjabis are also there in Pakistan in Balochistan and Punjab, majority of them are Hindus who migrated from Afghanistan mainly after conflict due to the persecution of Taliban and religious fanatics.

Community life and status

According to a study, the majority of the scheduled caste Hindus (79%) in Pakistan have experienced discrimination. The discrimination is higher in Southern Punjab (86.5%) compared to the rest of the country. The study found that majority (91.5% ) of the respondents in Rahimyar Khan, Bahawalpur, Tharparkar and Umerkot districts believed that political parties are not giving importance to them.

In Balochistan province, Hindus are relatively more secure and face less religious persecution. The tribal chiefs in Balochistan, particularly the Jams of Lasbela and Bugti of Dera Bugti, consider non-Muslims like Hindus as members of their own extended family and allows religious freedom. They have never forced Hindus to convert. Also, in Balochistan Hindu places of worship are proportionate to their population. For example, between Uthal and Bela jurisdiction in Lasbela District, there are 18 temples for 5,000 Hindus living in the area, which is an indicator of religious freedom. However, in Khuzdar District and Kalat District, Hindus face discrimination.

In Peshawar, capital of Khyber Pakhtunkhwa, Hindus enjoy religious freedom and live peacefully alongside the Muslims.
The city of Peshawar today is home to four Hindu tribes– the Balmiks, the Rajputs, the Heer Ratan Raths and the Bhai Joga Singh Gurdwara community. Since partition, the four tribes have lived in harmony with all religious communities including Muslims. However, there is the lack of upkeep of the dilapidated Hindu temples in the city. The local government always fails to assign caretakers and priests at temples. But in other parts of Kyber Pakhtunkhwa like Buner, Swat and Aurakzai Agencies, Hindu and Sikh families, have been targeted by Taliban for failing to pay Jizya (religious tax) and due to this more than 150 Sikhs and Hindu families in Pakistan's have moved to Hasan Abdal and Rawalpindi in Punjab in 2009

In central Punjab, Hindus are a small minority. After the partition, Hindus have been converting to Islam under pressure, particularly in Doda village near Sargodha. Due to the low population of Hindus in the Central Punjab, many of the Hindus have married Sikhs and vice versa. Intermarriages between the Hindus and Sikhs are very common there.

The Indus river is a holy river to many Hindus, and the Government of Pakistan periodically allows small groups of Hindus from India to make pilgrimage and take part in festivities in Sindh and Punjab. Rich Pakistani Hindus go to India and release their loved ones' remains into the Ganges. Those who cannot afford the trip go to Churrio Jabal Durga Mata temple in Nagarparkar.

Education and literacy rates
According to Pakistan's National Council for Justice and Peace (NCJP) report the average literacy rate among Hindu (upper caste) is 34 percent, Hindu (scheduled castes) is 19 percent, compared to the national average of 46.56 percent. According to a 2013 survey conducted by the Pakistan Hindu Seva Welfare Trust, the literacy rate among scheduled caste Hindus in Pakistan is just 16%. The survey noted that majority of the scheduled caste Hindu families don't send their girl children to schools due to the fear of forced conversion.

Hindu marriage acts and laws

There are two laws governing Hindu marriages-Sindh Hindu Marriage act of 2016 ( applicable only in the Sindh province), Hindu marriage act of 2017 ( applicable in Islamabad Capital Territory, Balochistan, Khyber-Pakhtunkhwa and Punjab provinces). However, there are no laws and amendments made to register a marriage between two Hindus – from one Province to another (Islamabad Capital Territory, Balochistan, Khyber-Pakhtunkhwa and Punjab).

The Sindh Hindu Marriage Bill was passed by the Provincial Assembly of Sindh in February 2016. This was the first Hindu Marriage act in Pakistan. It was amended in 2018 to include divorce rights, remarriage rights and financial security of the wife and children after divorce.

At federal level, a Hindu Marriage Bill was proposed in 2016, which was unanimously approved by the National Assembly of Pakistan in 2016 and by the Senate of Pakistan in 2017. In March 2017, the Pakistani President Mamnoon Hussain signed the Hindu Marriage Bill and thereby making it a law. Prime Minister Nawaz Sharif also mentioned that the marriage registrars will be established in areas where Hindus stay. However, many have criticised the Clause 12(iii) of the Hindu Marriage Bill which says that "a marriage will be annulled if any of the spouses converts to another religion".

Temples

The Communal violence of the 1940s and the subsequent persecutions have resulted in the destruction of many Hindu temples in Pakistan, although the Hindu community and the Government of Pakistan have preserved and protected many prominent ones. Some ancient Hindu temples in Pakistan draw devotees from across faiths including Muslims.

According to a survey, there were 428 Hindu temples in Pakistan at the time of Partition and 408 of them were now turned into toy stores, restaurants, government offices and schools. Among these 11 temples are in Sindh, four in Punjab, three in Balochistan and two in Khyber Pakhtunkhwa. However, in November 2019, government of Pakistan started the restoration process for 400 Hindu temples in Pakistan. After restoration, the temples will be reopened to Hindus in Pakistan.

The Pamwal Das Shiv Mandir, centuries-old historic temple in Baghdadi area of Lyari Town was illegally turned into a Muslim Pir and slaughterhouse for cows by Muslim clerics with the help of Baghdadi police after making series of attacks on Hindu families living in the area. The 135,000 acres of temple land is now controlled by the Evacuee Trust Property Board. The historic Kali Bari Hindu Temple has been rented out to a Muslim party in Dera Ismail Khan who converted the temple into a Hotel. The Holy Shiv Temple in Kohat has been converted into a government primary school. The Raam Kunde Complex of Temples at Saidpur village in Islamabad is now a picnic site. Another temple at Rawal Dam in Islamabad has been shut down and the Hindu community believes that the temple is going to dilapidate day by day without being handed over to them. In Punjab, a Hindu temple at Rawalpindi was destroyed and reconstructed to use as a community centre, while in Chakwal the Bhuwan temple complex is being used by the local Muslim community for commercial purposes.

Reopened temples

The Goraknath Temple which was closed in the 1947 was reopened in 2011 after a court ruling which ordered the Evacuee Trust Property Board to open it. Some temples were reopened and renovated in a public-private partnership like the Darya Lal Mandir in Karachi.

In 2019, the Pakistan Prime Minister Imran Khan said that his government will reclaim and restore 400 temples to Hindus. Following this, the 1,000-Year-Old Shivala Teja Singh temple in Sialkot (which was closed for 72 years) and a 100-year-old Hindu temple in Balochistan was reopened.

Major Pilgrimage centres
Shri Hinglaj Mata temple – Shakti peetha in Pakistan. The annual Hinglaj Yatra is the largest Hindu pilgrimage in Pakistan. More than 250,000 people take part in the Hinglaj Yathra during the spring.
Shri Ramdev Pir temple in Tando Allahyar District, in Sindh. The annual Ramdevpir mela in the temple is the second largest Hindu pilgrimage in Pakistan.
Umarkot Shiv Mandir –The three-day Shivrathri festival in the temple is famous. It is one of the biggest religious festivals in the country. It is attended by around 250,000 people. All the expenses were borne by the Pakistan Hindu Panchayat.
Churrio Jabal Durga Mata Temple – Famous for Shivrathri celebrations which is attended by 200,000 pilgrims. Hindus cremate the dead and ashes are preserved till Shivratri for immersion in the into holy water in Churrio Jabal Durga Mata Temple.

Riots, attacks and destruction of temples

 In 2006, a Hindu temple in Lahore was destroyed to pave the way for construction of a multi-storied commercial building. When reporters from Pakistan-based newspaper Dawn tried to cover the incident, they were accosted by the henchmen of the property developer, who denied that a Hindu temple existed at the site. 
In January 2014, a policeman standing guard outside a Hindu temple at Peshawar was gunned down. 25 March 2014 Express Tribune citing an All Pakistan Hindu Rights Movement (PHRM) survey said that 95% of all Hindu temples in Pakistan have been converted since 1990. Pakistanis attack Hindu temples if anything happens to any mosque in neighbouring India. 
 In 2014, a Hindu temple and a dharmashala in Larkana district in Sindh was attacked by a crowd of Muslims. 
 In 2019, three Hindu temples were vandalised in Ghotki district in Sindh over blasphemy accusations.
 In 2019, a Hindu temple Pakistan's southern Sindh province was vandalism by miscreants and they set fire to holy books and idols inside the temple.
 In January 2020, a Hindu temple in Chachro, Tharparkar district in Sindh was vandalised by miscreants, who desecrated the idols and set fire to holy scriptures.
 In December 2020, a Hindu temple in Teri village of Karak district was attacked and vandalised.
In August 2021, a Hindu Temple in Rahim Yar Khan in Punjab province of Pakistan was attacked by a Muslim Mob, burning down parts of it and damaging idols.

Religious persecution

There has been a historical decline of Hinduism, Buddhism and Sikhism in the areas of Pakistan. This happened for a variety of reasons even as these religions have continued to flourish beyond the eastern frontiers of Pakistan. The region became predominantly Muslim during the rule of Delhi Sultanate and later Mughal Empire. In general, religious conversion was a gradual process, though it is mostly attributed to the works of Sufis, some converted to Islam to gain tax relief, land grant, marriage partners, social and economic advancement, or freedom from slavery and some by force. The predominantly Muslim population supported Muslim League and Partition of India. After the independence of Pakistan in 1947, the minority Hindus and Sikhs migrated to India while the Muslims refugees from India migrated to Pakistan. Approximately 4.7 million Hindus and Sikhs moved to India while 6.5 million Muslims settled in Pakistan.

Some Hindus in Pakistan feel that they are treated as second-class citizens and many have continued to migrate to India. According to the Human Rights Commission of Pakistan data, around 1,000 Hindu families fled to India in 2013. In May 2014, a member of the ruling Pakistan Muslim League-Nawaz (PML-N), Dr Ramesh Kumar Vankwani, revealed in the National Assembly of Pakistan that around 5,000 Hindus are migrating from Pakistan to India every year.

Targeted sexual harassment 

Those Pakistani Hindus who have migrated to India allege that Hindu girls are sexually harassed in Pakistani schools and their religious practices are mocked. The Indian government is planning to issue Aadhaar cards and PAN cards to Pakistani Hindu refugees, and simplifying the process by which they can acquire Indian citizenship. In 2019, India passed the Citizenship (Amendment) Act, 2019 that allows the persecuted Pakistani Hindus and Sikhs who arrived in India before the end of December 2014 to obtain Indian citizenship.

Discrimination and attacks
Jogendranath Mandal, Pakistan's first minister of Law and Labour, left for India in 1950, 3 years after taking office, citing anti-Hindu bias by the bureaucracy. He quoted, “I have come to the conclusion that Pakistan is no place for Hindus to live in and that their future is darkened by the ominous shadow of conversion or liquidation”.

Separate electorates for Hindus and Christians were established in 1985—a policy originally proposed by Islamist leader Abul A'la Maududi. Christian and Hindu leaders complained that they felt excluded from the county's political process, but the policy had strong support from Islamists. Until 1999, when former military chief Pervez Musharaf overthrew Nawaz Sharif's government, non-Muslims had dual voting rights in the general elections that allowed them to not only vote for Muslim candidates on general seats, but also for their own non-Muslim candidates.

In the aftermath of the Babri Masjid demolition, widespread violence erupted against Hindus. Shops owned by Hindus were also attacked in Sukkur, Sindh. Hindu homes and temples were also attacked in Quetta.

In December 2020, a mob in Karak District attacked and set fire to a Hindu temple which was originally demolished in 1997 before being restored by the Pakistan Supreme Court in 2017. The head of the Pakistan Hindu Council, Ramesh Kumar Vankwani stated "“We will stage a protest in front of the Supreme Court against the attack on our temple which is one of the four largest holy sites of the Hindu community in Pakistan.” Religious discrimination remains common to this day throughout the country, and Pakistan has been designated a 'Country of Particular Concern' by the United States Commission on International Religious Freedom (USCIRF) for engaging in or tolerating "systematic, ongoing, egregious violations of religious freedom".

The rise of Taliban insurgency in Pakistan has been an influential and increasing factor in the persecution of and non-Muslims in Pakistan. Between 2011 and 2012, twenty three Hindus were kidnapped for ransom and 13 Hindus were killed as a part of targeted killings of non-Muslims. In January 2014, a policeman standing guard outside a Hindu temple at Peshawar was gunned down. Pakistan's Supreme Court has sought a report from the government on its efforts to ensure access for the minority Hindu community to temples – the Karachi bench of the apex court was hearing applications against the alleged denial of access to the members of the minority community.

Former Pakistan cricketer Danish Kaneria recently alleged mistreatment by team members and management for being a Hindu.

Islamic curriculum 

According to the Sustainable Development Policy Institute report, "Associated with the insistence on the Ideology of Pakistan has been an essential component of hate against India and the Hindus. For the upholders of the Ideology of Pakistan, the existence of Pakistan is defined only in relation to Hindus, and hence the Hindus have to be painted as negatively as possible".

A 2005 report by the National Commission for Justice and Peace, a non-profit organization, found that Pakistan Studies textbooks in Pakistan have been used to articulate the hatred that Pakistani policy-makers have attempted to inculcate towards the Hindus. "From the government-issued textbooks, students are taught that Hindus are backward and superstitious", the report stated.

In 1975, Islamiat or Islamic studies was made compulsory, resulting that a large number of minority students being forced to study Islamic Studies. In 2015, Khyber Pakhtunkhwa government introduced Ethics as an alternative subject to Islamiat for non-Muslim school children in the province followed by Sindh in 2016.

Hindu students are often forced to study as per the Islamic curriculum.  It has been reported that students are taught hatred against the Hindus in Pakistan's school.

In 2021, Single National Curriculum (SNC) was adopted by the Pakistan government in which instead of Islamiat for Muslims, the Non-Muslim students belonging to Hindu, Christian, Sikh, Kalash and Bahai religions will be taught separate books on their religion separately. 

As per the new Curriculum, Hindu students from Grade 1 to 5 will study about Om symbol, Dharma, Moksha, Karma yoga, Bhakti yoga, arti song Om Jai jagdhesh with meaning, Hindu celebrations (like Ram Navmi, Diwali, Cheti Chand, Janmashtami), Hindu deities (like Ganesh, Jhulelal, Sita) Prahlad pictorial life story of Ram, Krishna, Hindu Saints like Valmiki, Mira Bai, Kabir das, Tulsi das; Sacred places of Hindus in Pakistan like Sant Nenuram Ashram, Sadhu Bela, Hinglaj Mata Mandir etc.  The Brookings Institution, in a recent report evaluating the SNC, points to the phenomenon of isomorphic mimicry in which developing states “pretend to do the reforms that look like the kind of reforms that successful countries do” without actually changing much. SNC also aims at mainstreaming madrassas, which might lead to spilling over of extremist and more theological subjects into formal schools.

Prominent Pakistani Hindus

Modern-day Pakistan 
Danish Kaneria, Cricketer.
Anil Dalpat, first Hindu cricketer to play for Pakistan.
Deepak Perwani, Fashion designer.
Rana Bhagwandas, Former Chief Justice of the Supreme Court of Pakistan.
Naveen Perwani, Asian Games bronze medal winner and Sindh Snooker Cup winner.
Ramesh Kumar Vankwani, Politician and founder of Pakistan Hindu Council.
Mahesh Kumar Malani, First Hindu to win a general seat in the National Assembly of Pakistan.
Suman Bodani, the first Hindu woman to be appointed civil judge in Pakistan.
Pushpa Kumari Kohli is the first Hindu woman to become a police officer in Pakistan.
Veeru Kohli, Human rights activist.
Rana Chandra Singh, former Federal Minister of Pakistan and founder of Pakistan Hindu Party.
Rana Hamir Singh, current ruler of Umerkot.
Kailash Nath Kohli, Former Chief Justice of Balochistan High Court and Later Chairman Balochistan Public Service Commission. https://bhc.gov.pk/judges/former-judges/former-justices [230]
Kelash Kumar, Lieutenant Colonel, Pakistan Army serving officer.https://www.dawn.com/news/1677016 [231]
Ratna Bhagwandas Chawla, first Hindu woman elected to the Senate of Pakistan
Krishna Kohli, Member of the Senate of Pakistan 
Manisha Ropeta, first Hindu woman Deputy Superintendent of Police in Pakistan

See also

 Religion in Pakistan
 Hinglaj Mata mandir
 List of Hindu temples in Pakistan
 Pakistan Hindu Council
 Pakistan Hindu Panchayat
 Sikhism in Pakistan
 Sindhi Hindus
 Umarkot Shiv Mandir
 Hinduism in Punjab, Pakistan
 Hinduism in Balochistan
 Hinduism in Sindh province
 Hinduism in Khyber Pakhtunkhwa
 Persecution of Hindus in Pakistan

Notes

References

230. https://bhc.gov.pk/judges/former-judges/former-justices 
231. https://www.dawn.com/news/1677016

Further reading

External links

 
 
 
 
 
 

 
Hinduism and Islam
Ethnic groups in Pakistan
Religion in Pakistan
History of Pakistan
Hinduism in South Asia